Congolese Red Cross may refer to:

 Red Cross of the Democratic Republic of the Congo
 